The Training Regiment of the Artillery Command is the military unit responsible for providing ground artillery training to the units and personnel of the Italian Army. Made up of professional personnel, the Regiment is stationed in Bracciano (Rome).

The Training Regiment operates the OTO Melara Mod 56 howitzer on the Janiculum Hill in Rome.

History 

The Regiment is the heir of the units deployed at the Artillery School. It was established on 1 March 2006 within the now-dissolved  Artillery School, by merging and replacing the Training and Support Groups, with Colonel Federico Ralli as its first Commander.

The Training Regiment inherits the traditions of:
 152nd Artillery Regiment "Piceno";
 1st Group of the 13th Artillery Regiment;
 1st Self-Propelled Field Artillery Group "Cacciatori delle Alpi";
 18th Artillery Group "Gran Sasso";
 Self-propelled A.U.C. Group;
 Mechanical Towing A.U.C. Group;
 Specialists Group;
 Support Unit;
 Training Group;
 Support Group.

Following the 2010 reorganization of the Italian Army, the Training Regiment has been moved under the Artillery Command.

Organization 

The Training Regiment is currently structured on:
 Regimental Command;
 Operational and support Batteries;
 Training Group, on four Batteries;
 Didactic Department.

Regimental Command 
The Regimental Command, with the Logistics Battery, has the task of enabling the Regiment to operate in the best possible way under the tactical and logistical aspect and in the many activities to which it is called to operate, supporting it and supplying it with everything of which the Regiment may need.

Training Group 
The Training Group is a Battalion-level unit. The Group has the task of conducting the training and specialization of the Pupils Marshals and Sergeants, and the qualification, updating and specialization of Officers, NCOs, Volunteers in fixed position and in permanent service. The Training Group also organizes and conducts shooting schools.

See also 
 Artillery Command (Italy)
 Artillery School (Italy)

References 

Artillery regiments of Italy
Military units and formations established in 2006
Artillery units and formations